Ogun is a fictional character, a Japanese supervillain appearing in American comic books published by Marvel Comics. The character has been depicted as a foe of Wolverine. His first appearance was in Kitty Pryde and Wolverine #2 (December 1984), and was scripted by Chris Claremont and drawn by Allen Milgrom.

Fictional character biography
Ogun was a ninja and martial arts master who acted as Wolverine's mentor. Very little is known of his past or the exact nature of his abilities, but he was apparently a mutant who could possess and control minds via telepathy. His reflexes and reaction time also appear to have been enhanced beyond the range attainable by normal humans, such as that he was easily a match for Wolverine. Note that either or both of these abilities may have been wholly or partially mystical in nature.

Ogun first met Wolverine in Shanghai, China. Shanghai was held by the Empire of Japan, following the Battle of Shanghai in the Second Sino-Japanese War (1937–1945). Ogun was reportedly active in the War as a captain of the Imperial Japanese Army. Wolverine was only a wandering sailor but managed to draw the attention of the captain who would seek his acquaintance. The issue was scripted by Larry Hama and drawn by Leinil Francis Yu.

At some point in the past, Ogun fell from the path of honor and was a criminal enforcer for the Yakuza. Ogun mentally possessed Kitty Pryde trained as a ninja, and attempted to turn her into an assassin. Under Wolverine's care, however, Kitty recovered and resisted another brainwashing attempt, and Wolverine was eventually forced to kill Ogun.

Years later, Ogun returned as a disembodied spirit, mentally possessing host after host, and again attacked Wolverine and Kitty. With Ghost Rider's help, Wolverine figured out that to destroy Ogun involved only destroy Ogun's enchanted mask (apparently he had several as the first was already destroyed). Ogun was thus destroyed, seemingly for good.

Later, Ogun returned yet again, this time travelling from host body to host body, and he even tried to take over Lady Deathstrike's body. Wolverine found a way to force him out of all available host bodies and into the body of Viper who Wolverine impaled (non-lethally). Panicking, Ogun jumped from Viper's body but having no form to inhabit, seemed to evaporate away.

But as seen somewhat later, Ogun even survived that and tried to take his revenge on Pryde and Wolverine by luring the two onboard of the Hellicarrier he was able to control through the cyberpathy advancements he learned while taking over Lady Deathstrike, but once again he was defeated. It is not known what happened after Kitty managed to convince him of the error of his ways inside the astral plane.

Ogun's clan is now shown to be run by Sojobo and Karasu, a pair of psychic twins he had adopted as a son and daughter prior to his demise. The children are rescued from this brutal existence by David Haller who shows them that they don't have to follow in their father's murderous footsteps. After a skirmish with the X-Men, the twins are then taken to the Jean Grey School for Higher Learning.

Ogun's spirit later resurfaces and tries to possess Kitty once more before his host manages to drive him out. It's also revealed that Ogun had murdered Cyber in an attempt to sell the villain's adamantium-laced corpse to Abraham Cornelius.

Ogun's spirit possessed the fighter Shogun.

Powers and abilities
The extent and nature of Ogun's powers was never fully revealed. He demonstrated the ability to control minds and could remove his spirit from his body and place in a new host (submerging that host body's personality). His original body also seemed to be somewhat resistant to injury, although Wolverine managed to kill him. Ogun was able to survive impalement through the torso by a sword thrust with no apparent ill-effects. His reflexes and agility were heightened beyond normal human levels. It is implied that Ogun was a telepath who also had some mystical powers, but this was never clearly specified. In life, Ogun was also apparently capable of slowing or completely halting his aging; a legend is mentioned where he had once a duel of wills with the Japanese swordmaster Miyamoto Musashi.

In other media

 Ogun appears in the Wolverine and the X-Men episode "Code of Conduct", voiced by James Sie. This version is Wolverine's sensei.
 A character inspired by Ogun and the Silver Samurai named Ichirō Yashida appears in The Wolverine, with Haruhiko Yamanouchi portraying his older self and Ken Yamamura portraying his younger self. He is the founder of the Yashida Clan's technology empire, Shingen Yashida's father, Mariko Yashida's grandfather, and Yukio's foster father. As a young man in the Japanese military during WWII, Ichirō was saved by Logan during the United States' atomic bombing of Nagasaki and became obsessed with the latter's healing factor and immortality. As an old man dying of cancer in the present, Ichirō arranges for Logan to see him one more time and asks Mariko to succeed him instead of Shingen before seemingly dying. In reality, Ichirō faked his death and tasked Viper with helping him develop a giant robotic suit made of adamantium armed with a katana and wakazashi capable of being super-heated to sustain himself and steal Logan's powers. After eliminating his enforcer Kenuichio Harada for betraying him, Ichirō uses his adamantium weapons to sever Logan's adamantium claws and extract his healing factor. However, Mariko uses the claws to attack Ichirō, who loses control of his suit while Logan regenerates his original bone claws and kills him.
 ToyBiz's Marvel Legends line's Wolverine figure comes with a display stand featuring Ogun.

References

Fictional kenjutsuka
Fictional Ninjutsu practitioners
Fictional ninja
Fictional characters with spirit possession or body swapping abilities
Fictional swordfighters in comics
Comics characters introduced in 1984
Marvel Comics martial artists
Marvel Comics telepaths
Marvel Comics supervillains
Characters created by Chris Claremont
Characters created by Al Milgrom
Fictional characters with slowed ageing